Bulloo may refer to:
 Australia
 Bulloo River in South-West Queensland
 Bulloo-Bancannia drainage basin in Queensland and New South Wales
 Shire of Bulloo, a local government area in Queensland
 Bulloo Downs, Queensland, a locality in the Shire of Bulloo
 Bulloo Downs Station, a pastoral property in South-West Queensland
 Bulloo Downs Station (Western Australia), a pastoral property in Western Australia
 Electoral district of Bulloo, an electoral district in South-West Queensland